The 2001 Speedway Grand Prix Qualification or GP Challenge was a series of motorcycle speedway meetings used to determine the 12 riders that would qualify for the 2001 Speedway Grand Prix to join the other 10 riders that finished in the leading positions from the 2000 Speedway Grand Prix.

The format was similar to the previous year, in that 2 riders would qualify straight from the Intercontinental and Continental finals and 10 riders would qualify through the GP Challenge.

Peter Karlsson won the GP Challenge.

Format
 First Round - 6 riders from Sweden, 5 from Denmark, 3 from Norway, 2 from Finland to Scandinavian Final
 First Round - 27 riders from Continental quarter finals to Continental semi-finals
 First Round - 8 riders from British Final to Overseas Final
 First Round - 2 riders from Australian Final to Overseas Final
 First Round - 1 rider from New Zealand Final to Overseas Final
 First Round - 3 riders from United States Final to Overseas Final
 Second Round - 8 riders from Scandinavian Final to Intercontinental Final
 Second Round - 8 riders from Overseas Final to Intercontinental Final
 Second Round - 16 riders from Continental semi-finals to Continental Final
 Third Round - 11 riders from positions 11-21  from the 2000 Grand Prix, World U21 champion & host rider to GP Challenge
 Third Round - 1 rider from the Continental Final to 2001 Grand Prix and 4 to GP Challenge
 Third Round - 1 rider from the Intercontinental Final to 2001 Grand Prix and 7 to GP Challenge
 Final Round - 10 riders from the GP Challenge to the 2001 Grand Prix

First round

Continental quarter finals

Second round

Overseas Final
 8 riders to Intercontinental Final

Scandinavian Final
8 riders to Intercontinental Final

Continental semi finals

Third round
11 riders from positions 11-21 from the 2000 Speedway Grand Prix, World U21 champion & host rider to GP Challenge

Intercontinental Final
 1 rider direct to Grand Prix, 7 riders to GP Challenge

Continental Final 
1 rider direct to Grand Prix, 4 riders to GP Challenge
9 July 2000  Lonigo

Final Round

GP Challenge
10 riders to 2001 Grand Prix
8 October 2000  Abensberg

References 

Speedway Grand Prix Qualification
Speedway Grand Prix Qualifications
Qualification